Tasil (also spelled Tsil) is a town in southern Syria, administratively part of the Izra District of the Daraa Governorate. Nearby localities include Nawa to the northeast, Adwan and al-Shaykh Saad to the east, Jalin and Tafas to the south, Saham al-Jawlan to the southwest and Saida and the Golan Heights to the west. According to the Syria Central Bureau of Statistics, Tasil had a population of 15,985 in the 2004 census. It is the administrative center of a nahiyah ("subdistrict") consisting of three localities with a combined population of 17,778 in 2004.

History
Ancient remains in Tasil indicate that a temple dedicated to one of the Roman emperors Constantine the Great or Constantius II and dated to the early 4th-century CE was located in the village. Tasil might be the "Tharsila on the Batanea" listed by Eusebius as inhabited by Samaritans, though no other literary or archaeological evidence for a Samaritan past is known. Tasil played a role in a number of engagements between the Byzantine and Muslim Arab armies in the Hauran during the Muslim conquest of Syria in the early-mid 7th-century.

In 1596, Tasil appeared in Ottoman tax registers as a village in the Nahiya of Jawlan Sargi in the Qada of Hawran. It had a population of 37 Muslim households and 25 bachelors. They paid a fixed tax-rate of 25% on wheat, barley, summer crops, goats or beehives, and a water mill; a total of 4,500  akçe.

In the late 19th-century Tasil was a large village with about 90 houses constructed from stone and mud brick. The population was about 300, all Muslims. Its main source of water was natural pool, consisting of 50 square yards, called al-Birkeh ("the Pool") situated to the north. In dry seasons village residents had to travel to the Allan spring. Most of the archaeological fragments of Tasil were built into the village's houses and mosques, many of them hidden by the plaster. There was a local superstition among Tasil's inhabitants that any resident who removed and gave travelers stones from the village's structures would be punished by God either by death or another misfortune.

Israeli paratroopers landed in Tasil on 10 June 1953 according to Syrian officials at the time. A dam was constructed near the village in the late 1970s.

During the Syrian Civil War, Tasil came under the influence of rebel Free Syrian Army forces. Later in the war, in February 2017, an isolated pocket of ISIL affiliated forces captured it from rebels during the Southwestern Daraa offensive (February 2017)

On 27 July 2018, the Syrian army recaptured the town of Tasil from ISIL.

Archaeology
Two notable ancient structures were located in Tasil, near the residence of the sheikh ("local chief.") They stood adjacent to each other and were known as "Jama'ah" and "Medany." The Jama'ah served as a mosque with an interior area of 53 x 40 feet and a roof supported by four square pillars. While the mosque appears to be of Islamic construction, it was possibly built on the site of an ancient synagogue or church. It had a courtyard to its east that measured 53 x 37 feet and was enclosed by basalt walls. In the southwestern corner of the mosque stood the ruined Medany tower which had a height of 20 feet and was supported by three columns.

In the fields west of Tsil lay numerous dolmens, although most of them are collapsed or ruined.

References

Bibliography

External links
Map of the town, Google Maps 
Boutmiye-map, 20K

Populated places in Izra' District
Towns in Syria